The GP2X Wiz is a handheld game console and portable media player developed by South Korean company GamePark Holdings running a Linux kernel-based embedded operating system. It was released on May 12, 2009, and was also the first console from both Game Park and Game Park Holdings to be also released outside South Korea. It is the successor to the GP2X.

Overview
An image of the Wiz system was first leaked on the web in late July 2008. Rumors had been circulating that GamePark Holdings was in the process of making a new handheld, since they had abruptly discontinued production of its first handheld, the GP2X, in late June/early July. Prior to the official announcement, this handheld was sometimes referred to as the GP3X.

On August 26, 2008, GamePark Holdings announced that it was planning to release a new handheld, named the Wiz. Along with the announcement, a brochure detailing a great amount of launch information was released, complete with the system's specs. The brochure stated that new games would be released every month for the system; This is a deviation from the GP2X, which did not have many commercial games. However, the Wiz still appears to be primarily advertised as an open-source system, meant for homebrew development of games and emulators.

On September 2, 2008, it was reported that the GP2X Wiz's button layout was to be revised, and the second D-Pad on the right-hand side of the system was to be removed. In order to make these design changes, the release of the system was to be pushed back to November 2008.

Around the last week of April 2009, GamePark shipped test units of the GP2X Wiz. These are thought to be the final hardware revision before the actual product launch.

Retailers for the GP2X Wiz stated that they planned to begin shipping the GP2X Wiz as soon as October 8, 2008. , retailers are listing the price of the Wiz at US$179.99. The GP2X Wiz started shipping as of May 13, 2009.

An online application store was set to launch in August of 2009.

Official accessories for the GP2X Wiz include the Accessory Kit (which comes with an SD card case, a wrist strap, and a spare stylus), a screen protector, and a Genuine Leather Case.

The successor of GP2X Wiz is GP2X Caanoo.

Myungtendo
In February 2009, South Korean president Lee Myung-bak had stated that "Korea needs to develop a video game console like a Nintendo DS". This statement was parodied with the "Myungtendo MB", an obvious rip-off of the Nintendo DS. While completely unrelated to the Myungtendo incident, the GP2X Wiz is often nicknamed as the "Myungtendo", due to its release shortly after the statement.

Hardware

Specifications
 Chipset: MagicEyes Pollux System-on-a-Chip VR3520F
 CPU: 533 MHz ARM926TEJ (overclockable to 900 MHz, however the system can become unstable over 750 MHz)
 NAND Flash Memory: 1 GB
 RAM: DDR SDRAM 64 MB
 Operating System: Linux-based OS
 Storage: SD Card (SDHC support)
 Connection to PC: USB 2.0 High Speed
 USB Host: USB 1.1
 Power: Internal 2000mAh Lithium Polymer Battery (approx. 7 hours game/video playback)
 Display: 320x240  AMOLED Touch Screen
 Stereo audio DAC: Cirrus Logic 43L22
 Embedded Microphone
 Physical size: 
 Weight: 98 g (without battery), 136 g (with battery)
 3D Acceleration (GPU embedded on Pollux)
 Chipset supports OpenGL ES 1.1
 133M Texel/sec, 1.33M Polygon/sec.

Based on the specs released by GamePark Holdings, the Wiz appears to have a considerably more slim and compact form factor than that of the GP2X. The Wiz also has a fairly large amount of built in flash memory, which GamePark has stated will be used to hold games that will be included with the system. OLED screens have much better contrast ratios than LCD screens, particularly because, unlike LCDs, they can display true black.

Multimedia support

Video
 Container files: AVI
 Video formats: DivX, XviD, MPEG4, AVI and others via software: flv, mp4, mkv...
 Audio formats: MP3, WAV and others via software.
 Maximum Resolution: 640*480
 Maximum Frame Rate: 30 frame/s
 Maximum Video Bitrate: 2500kbit/s
 Maximum Audio Bitrate: 384kbit/s
 Captions: SMI

Audio
 Audio formats: MP3, Ogg Vorbis, WAV (more via software)
 Channels: Stereo
 Frequency Range: 20 Hz - 20 kHz
 Power output: 100 mW
 Sample Resolution/Rate: 16bit/8–48 kHz, in 8bit/22 kHz

Photos
 Supports JPG, PNG, GIF, BMP File Formats (more via software)

Flash Player
The system was initially supposed to ship with Flash Player 7. The Wiz also has Flash Player 8 with ActionScript 2.0 support, allowing it to play flash games from the Internet.

Games

The Wiz had only four commercial retail games, these are:

Deicide 3: Distorted Existence
Propis
Redemption: Liar
Rhythmos

The Wiz can run many emulators, freeware games, flash games, and applications. The GP2X Wiz comes pre-installed with a number of games on the NAND.

IQ Jump
This is a collection of 5 brain training style games.
Look for the same pictures
Look for the missing number
Addition and Subtraction
Look for the coin in the saving pocket
Crisis Ladder

Animatch by Ruckage
Square Tower Defence by Alex
Wiztern by Chemaris
Myriad by Clare Jonsson
Tail Tale by Rerofumi
Boomshine2x by Peter Roberts
Space Varments by Ruckage

 Originally a game called Snake on Dope was shipped with the unit, and may have been removed due to copyright issues relating to the music.

Upcoming Games in 2011
SORR (Streets of Rage Remake) A fan made tribute to all SOR Games developed by BomberGames took 8 years to make and was released in June 2011 as freeware. (SEGA Blocked its release *See Below*) 
Sega are in current negotiations with BomberGames. For the time being SEGA has blocked the game's release, BomberGames are looking for a speedy resolution

See also
Comparison of handheld game consoles
 GP32 - Predecessor device
 Pandora (console), an open source handheld device

References

External links
 Wiz File Archive
 Emuboards Wiz News
 PDRoms Wiz News & Wiz Files
 Blog Site Covering GP2X Wiz
 Wiz News & Development (French/français)
 Open-source gaming goes commercial with Wiz handheld, 27 August 2008, Frank Caron, Ars Technica

ARM-based video game consoles
Seventh-generation video game consoles
Linux-based video game consoles
Handheld game consoles